Charles Hannaford (8 January 1896 – July 1970) was an English footballer who played as a forward. Born in Finsbury Park, London, he played for Maidstone United, Millwall, Charlton Athletic, Clapton Orient, and Manchester United.

External links
MUFCInfo.com profile

1896 births
1970 deaths
English footballers
Maidstone United F.C. (1897) players
Millwall F.C. players
Manchester United F.C. players
Leyton Orient F.C. players
Charlton Athletic F.C. players
Footballers from Finsbury Park
Association football forwards